The following is a List of Georgia State Bicycle Routes. These routes are designated by the Georgia Department of Transportation.


History
Georgia established a numbered bicycle route system of 14 routes in the mid-1990s. Two of the routes, 15 and 95, are to become incorporated into the United States Numbered Bicycle Routes system as U.S. Bicycle Route 15 and U.S. Bicycle Route 1 respectively.

List of routes

State Bicycle Route 5

Georgia State Bicycle Route 5 (Chattahoochee Trace) runs  from Lake Seminole north to the Tennessee border in Lookout Mountain, running through the western part of the state. The route passes through Blakely, Fort Gaines, Lumpkin, Cusseta, Columbus, Greenville, Newnan, Carrollton, and Rome.

State Bicycle Route 10

Georgia State Bicycle Route 10 (Southern Crossing) runs  from Lake Seminole east to Jekyll Island, running through the southern part of the state. The route passes through Bainbridge, Cairo, Thomasville, Quitman, Valdosta, Lakeland, Waycross, Nahunta, and Brunswick.

State Bicycle Route 15

Georgia State Bicycle Route 15 (Central) runs  from the Florida border south of Lake Park north to Acworth. The route roughly follows the I-75 corridor south of the Atlanta area before bypassing the Atlanta area to the west. The route passes through Valdosta, Tifton, Ashburn, Cordele, Vienna, Perry, Warner Robins, Macon, Forsyth, Barnesville, Fayetteville, Palmetto, and Lithia Springs.

State Bicycle Route 20

Georgia State Bicycle Route 20 (Wiregrass) runs  from Blakely north to Waycross, passing through Leesburg, Ashburn, Fitzgerald, and Douglas.

State Bicycle Route 35

Georgia State Bicycle Route 35 (March to the Sea) runs  from Savannah northwest to the Tennessee border in Rossville, passing through Statesboro, Millen, Louisville, Sandersville, Milledgeville, Eatonton, Madison, Atlanta, Marietta, Calhoun, and Ringgold.

State Bicycle Route 40

Georgia State Bicycle Route 40 (TransGeorgia) runs  from the Columbus area east to Savannah, passing through Butler, Fort Valley, Warner Robins, Dublin, Soperton, and Metter.

State Bicycle Route 45

Georgia State Bicycle Route 45 (Little White House) runs  from Ellerslie north to two separate branches to Atlanta and Palmetto, passing through Woodbury and Fayetteville.

State Bicycle Route 50

Georgia State Bicycle Route 50 (Augusta Link) runs  from Thomson east to Augusta.

State Bicycle Route 55

Georgia State Bicycle Route 55 (Appalachian Gateway) runs  from Bike Route 70 near Suwanee north to Robertstown, passing through Gainesville and Cleveland.

State Bicycle Route 60

Georgia State Bicycle Route 60 (Athens Link) runs  from Bike Route 70 near Grayson east to Elberton, passing through Winder, Watkinsville, and Athens.

State Bicycle Route 70

Georgia State Bicycle Route 70 (Northern Crescent) runs  from Acworth east to Snellville, bypassing Atlanta to the north. The route passes through Alpharetta and Lawrenceville.

State Bicycle Route 85

Georgia State Bicycle Route 85 (Savannah River Run) runs  from Savannah north to the North Carolina border in Dillard, running through the eastern part of the state. The route passes through Springfield, Sylvania, Millen, Thomson, Washington, Elberton, Hartwell, Toccoa, and Clayton.

State Bicycle Route 90

Georgia State Bicycle Route 90 (Mountain Crossing) runs  from Cloudland Canyon east to Tallulah Falls, running through the northern part of the state. The route passes through La Fayette, Dalton, Chatsworth, Ellijay, and Dahlonega.

State Bicycle Route 95

Georgia State Bicycle Route 95 (Coastal) runs  from the Florida border near Kingsland north to the South Carolina border near Clyo, running through the coastal area of the state. The route passes through Woodbine, Brunswick, Darien, Savannah, and Springfield.

References

External links

Bike paths in Georgia (U.S. state)
Georgia State